Yenişakran is a town in İzmir Province, Turkey

Geography 

It is situated at a bay of the Aegean Sea.
The population of the town is 3552  as of 2011.

History 

Although Yenişakran is founded only recently the vicinity of the town is rich in historical ruins. There are at least three sites of ancient settlements to the south of yenişakran,  Ancient Kyme is in Aliağa. Another site Myrina which was founded by Tezeus in the 11th century BC is to on the way connecting Yenişakran to Aliağa and Gryneion is just at the south of Yenişakran. The ruins to the north of the town may even be more ancient. However in contrast to historical ruins Yenişakran is relatively a recent town. The very first settlement began in 1949 and Yenişakran gained the status of village in 1955. After the rapid growth in population in 1982 Yenişakran was declared a township.

Economy 

The main agricultural wealth  is olive. Fruit production and cattle breeding are other important economic activities. Tourism is also an important sector. being relatively near to big city of İzmir yenişakran hosts summer house vacationists.

References

Populated places in İzmir Province
Towns in Turkey
Aliağa District
Populated coastal places in Turkey